The Chan Zuckerberg Initiative (CZI) is an organization established and owned by Facebook founder Mark Zuckerberg and his wife Priscilla Chan with an investment of 99 percent of the couple's wealth from their Facebook shares over their lifetime. The CZI is set up as a limited liability company (LLC) and is an example of philanthrocapitalism.  CZI has been deemed likely to be "one of the most well-funded philanthropies in human history". Its creation was announced on 1 December 2015, for the birth of their daughter, Maxima Chan Zuckerberg. Priscilla Chan has said that her background as a child of immigrant refugees and experience as a teacher and pediatrician for vulnerable children influences how she approaches the philanthropy's work in science, education, immigration reform, housing, criminal justice, and other local issues.

The Chan Zuckerberg Initiative's main areas of work include Science, Education, and Justice and Opportunity, which focuses on promoting housing affordability, criminal justice reform, and immigration reform. The mission of the Chan Zuckerberg Initiative is to "build a more inclusive, just, and healthy future for everyone" and to "advance human potential and promote equality in areas such as health, education, scientific research and energy".

In 2017, the Chan Zuckerberg Initiative pre-leased a 102,079 square foot portion of the new Broadway Station development in downtown Redwood City, California where it is headquartered.

Activities

Education  

The Chan Zuckerberg Initiative invested $24 million in Andela, a startup focused on training software developers in Africa through a bootcamp and four-year fellowship program which pairs their trainees with U.S. companies needing development help. The Chan Zuckerberg Initiative led the company's Series B funding.

In September 2016, Indian education startup Byju's's announced raising $50 million in a round co-led by The Chan Zuckerberg Initiative and Sequoia Capital, along with investors Sofina, Lightspeed Venture Partners, and Times Internet. The funding has been raised to fuel their international expansion.

On 6 March 2018, the Harvard Gazette published that the Chan Zuckerberg Initiative would pledge $30 million to the Reach Every Reader project. Both Harvard's President Drew Faust and MIT's President L. Rafael Reif were quoted in the article, as was Priscilla Chan, HGSE Dean James E. Ryan, and MIT's Sanjay Sarma, VP for Open Learning at MIT, and others.  The article states: "To make significant progress in early literacy at scale, the team will engage in a rigorous, scientific approach to personalized diagnosis and intervention. They will develop and test a scalable, web-based screening tool for reading difficulties that diagnoses the underlying causes, and a set of targeted home/school interventions that change the way we approach intervention for young children with reading difficulties."

The Chan Zuckerberg Initiative is supporting the development of a civic tech talent pipeline by funding Coding it Forward.

The Initiative has funded a free online learning platform, Summit Learning, that is based on a personalized learning philosophy. The use of the platform in some schools have led to concerns about efficacy and student privacy.

The Chan Zuckerberg Initiative has funded a number of small-scale, grassroots initiatives to better understand the "physical, mental, social and emotional health and development of students as a way to improve academic success," as well as new efforts to make Native American or Black culture more embedded in students' curriculums. Chan said "We have to be really thoughtful about how we can be helpful and build a collective community alongside others and behind practitioners and school leaders" and that educational initiatives must be responsive to local needs because "there is not one thing that's going to solve everything."

In May 2022, the Chan Zuckerberg initiative announced grants totalling more than $4 million in support education communities. The grants will support a range of professional learning, mentoring and wellness practices to support teacher retention. The grants include $1 million donations to FuelED, The Teacher well, Profound Gentlemen, and $500,000 donations to Profound Ladies and Black Male Educators Alliance of Michigan.

Housing and Economic Opportunity 

The Chan Zuckerberg Initiative, in partnership with The San Francisco Foundation and other philanthropic, business, and health organizations, created the Partnership for the Bay's Future in 2019 to "preserve, produce, and protect affordable housing". The Partnership includes a $500+ million fund for subsidized affordable housing units in the Bay Area, as well as grants for local governments and community organizations to work together to pass local housing legislation that protects tenants and promotes affordability.

On 1 October 2018, The Chan Zuckerberg Initiative announced it was helping to launch Opportunity Insights, a new non-partisan, not-for-profit research and policy institute focused on improving economic opportunity led by Raj Chetty, John Friedman, and Nathaniel Hendren, leading economists from Harvard University and Brown University. The research aims to "better understand the drivers of poverty as well as solutions that can foster greater economic mobility and security for more families".

Politics 

The Chan Zuckerberg Initiative supported the failed campaign for California Proposition 15, which would have adjusted the original Proposition 13, for the 2020 general election.

In addition, the Chan Zuckerberg Initiative opposed the failed 2020 California Proposition 20, a measure which would have led to stricter sentencing and parole laws.

Following electoral defeats of CZI-backed initiatives in 2020, the CZI announced a restructuring that would no longer fund political campaigns directly.

Scientific research 

The Chan Zuckerberg Initiative has invested heavily in coronavirus research and response following the COVID-19 outbreak in 2020. The organization has contributed multiple grants to various universities and partnerships studying how the coronavirus spreads and possible treatments or vaccines. The Chan Zuckerberg Biohub partnered with Stanford and UCSF to help to significantly increase free testing in the Bay Area starting in March 2020. The Chan Zuckerberg Biohub announced in July 2020 that it would partner with all 58 California county departments of public health to provide free genomic sequencing of positive coronavirus samples to better understand how the virus is spreading and inform policy decisions.

The Chan Zuckerberg Initiative's first acquisition took place in January 2017 with the acquisition of Meta, a Toronto-based artificial intelligence scientific literature search engine that helps scientists collaborate on solutions and accelerates the dissemination of new scientific research. On October 28, 2021, CZI announced the sunset of Meta, with a proposed shutdown date of March 31, 2022.

In September 2016, CZI announced its new science program, Chan Zuckerberg Science, with $3 billion in investment over the next decade, with Cornelia Bargmann of Rockefeller University announced as the first president of science, to begin 1 October 2016. The goal of the program is to help cure, manage, or prevent all disease by the year 2100. $600 million of the $3 billion would be spent on Biohub, a location in San Francisco's Mission Bay District near the University of California, San Francisco, to allow for easy interaction and collaboration between scientists at University of California, San Francisco; University of California, Berkeley; Stanford University; and other universities in the area, as well as engineers and others. Commentators saw the move as audacious but a worthwhile goal, while noting that the amount of funding is small relative to overall money spent on biomedical research. This funding is equal to roughly 2% of the NIH budget earmarked for basic research over the same time frame. Any patents generated at Biohub would be jointly owned by Biohub and the discoverer's home institution.

Company form and taxation 

The Chan Zuckerberg Initiative is not a charitable trust or a private foundation but a limited liability company, and is therefore not a tax-exempt organization as many philanthropies are. As an LLC, the organization has more flexibility in how it addresses its goals, and can invest in for-profit startup companies, can spend money on advocacy initiatives and lobbying, can make political donations, does not have to disclose the pay of its top five executives and has fewer other transparency requirements compared to a charitable trust. Under this legal structure, as Forbes wrote it, "Zuckerberg will still control the Facebook shares owned by the Chan Zuckerberg Initiative". The Chan Zuckerberg Initiative publicly lists its grants, a level of transparency not required for an LLC. It has pledged to release software developed by it or its grantees under open-source licenses.

See also 
 Good Ventures, started by Facebook co-founder Dustin Moskovitz and his wife Cari Tuna, who takes care of its day-to-day operations
 Corporate social responsibility
 Philanthropy in the United States
 Philanthrocapitalism

References

External links 

 

Organizations established in 2015
Philanthropic organizations based in the United States
Facebook
Chan Zuckerberg Initiative
Zuckerberg family